Frea jaguarita is a species of beetle in the family Cerambycidae. It was described by Chevrolat in 1855.

References

jaguarita
Beetles described in 1855